El Salvador Airport  is an airstrip in the pampa of the Beni Department in Bolivia. The nearest town is San Borja,  to the south.

See also

Transport in Bolivia
List of airports in Bolivia

References

External links 
OpenStreetMap - El Salvador
OurAirports - El Salvador
Fallingrain - El Salvador Airport

Airports in Beni Department